Nightflight is an album by Hungarian guitarist Gábor Szabó, released in 1976. The album produced the biggest hit of his career, a remake of producer Bunny Sigler's song "Keep Smilin'."

Track listing
"Concorde (Nightflight)" (Szabó, Richie Rome) – 6:48
"Funny Face" (Bunny Sigler, Morris Bailey, Richie Rome) – 2:59
"Baby Rattle Snake" (Bunny Sigler, Kim Miller) – 6:50
"Theme for Gabor" (Richie Rome) – 4:20
"Keep Smilin'" (Bunny Sigler, Allan Felder) – 7:24
"Every Minute Counts" (Szabó, Richie Rome) – 6:49
"Smooth Sailin'" (Mike Holden, Theodore Life) – 6:45

Personnel
Gábor Szabó – guitar
Theodore Life - guitar
Bundion Siggalucci (aka Bunny Sigler) – guitar, piano, vocals
Raymond Earl - bass
Scotty Miller – drums
Johnnie McCants – conga, bongo
Dexter Wansel – synthesizer
James Sigler - organ
string orchestra

References

 

Gábor Szabó albums
1976 albums
Mercury Records albums